Methylhydrazines are hydrazines that have additional methyl groups. Heavily methylated versions exist as hydrazinium salts.

Members of this class include: 
 Monomethylhydrazine
 Dimethylhydrazines
 Symmetrical dimethylhydrazine (1,2-dimethylhydrazine)
 Unsymmetrical dimethylhydrazine (1,1-dimethylhydrazine)
 Trimethylhydrazine
 1,1,2-trimethylhydrazine
 1,1,1-trimethylhydrazinium (cationic and exists as a variety of salts e.g. 1,1,1-trimethylhydrazinium iodide)
 Tetramethylhydrazine
1,1,2,2-tetramethylhydrazine
1,1,1,2-tetramethylhydrazinium (cationic and exists as a variety of salts)
 Pentamethylhydrazinium (cationic and exists as a variety of salts)
 Hexamethylhydrazinediium (dication, exists as a variety of salts)

External links
 

Hydrazines